

Ashanti Region 
There are more than 180 Senior High Schools in the region.

Bono, Bono East & Ahafo Regions

Central Region

Eastern Region

Greater Accra Region

Northern Region

Oti Region

Upper East Region

Upper West Region

Volta Region

Western & Western North Region

See also 

 Education in Ghana
 List of schools in Ghana

References

Sources and external links 
 Complete Ghana School List (Includes Universities and Colleges)
 Ministry of Education of Ghana:Senior Secondary Schools
 Best senior high schools in Ghana according to WAEC at TechEngage
 The SCHOOL MAPPING & MONITORING PORTAL (Ghana Education Service, Ministry of Education, Ghana) also has data for Senior High Schools in Ghana.

|}

Schools

Schools
Ghana
Ghana